Óscar Pelegrí Ferrandis (born 30 May 1994) is a Spanish road and track cyclist, who currently rides for UCI Continental team . He competed at the 2019 UEC European Track Championships.

Major results

2015
 3rd Road race, National Under-23 Road Championships
2016
 1st  Road race, National Under-23 Road Championships
2017
 National Track Championships
2nd Madison (with Sebastián Mora)
2nd Team pursuit
2018
 National Track Championships
1st  Madison (with Sebastián Mora)
3rd Team pursuit
 1st Stage 3 Grande Prémio de Portugal N2
 8th Clássica da Arrábida
2021
 1st Stage 3 Tour de Bretagne
 4th Overall Tour of Bulgaria
 5th Overall In the Steps of Romans
 5th Overall Okolo Jižních Čech

References

External links

 

1994 births
Living people
Spanish track cyclists
Spanish male cyclists
People from Plana Baixa
Sportspeople from the Province of Castellón
Competitors at the 2018 Mediterranean Games
European Games competitors for Spain
Cyclists at the 2019 European Games
Mediterranean Games competitors for Spain
Cyclists from the Valencian Community